Faker may refer to:

 Charlatan, someone who fakes
 Faker (band), Australian alternative rock band formed in Sydney in 1996
 Faker (comics), Vertigo imprint comic book published by DC Comics
 Faker (gamer), the in-game name of Korean professional League of Legends player Lee Sang-Hyeok (born 1996)
 Faker (Masters of the Universe), fictional character from the Masters of the Universe franchise
 The Faker, 1929 American silent film

See also 
 Chet Faker (born Nicholas James Murphy, 1988), Australian musician
 Fakir (disambiguation)
 Fake (disambiguation)
 Faking (disambiguation)
 Poseur